Netaji Subhash Chandra Bose Medical College (NSCB Medical College) is the second oldest medical college in the state of Madhya Pradesh, India. It was founded in 1955 as Government Medical College, Jabalpur. Admission is through a pre-medical entrance exam and the current class size is 180 students per year. It has a full service medical hospital on campus which is the main teaching hospital. It is also accredited for Post graduate and subspeciality medical education.

It is named after Netaji Subhas Chandra Bose, the most prominent leader of the Indian independence movement. The Dean of NSCB Medical College is Dr PK Kasar.

NSCB Medical is located in the Garha region of Jabalpur, and is surrounded by hills.

Notable alumni
Yogesh Kumar Chawla - Padma Shri awardee, former Director of Postgraduate Institute of Medical Education and Research.
Pradeep Chowbey - Padma Shri awardee, Chairman of Max Healthcare.
Narmada Prasad Gupta - Padma Shri awardee, Chairman of Academics and Research Division Urology at Medanta.
Pukhraj Bafna - Padma Shri awardee.
Shashi Wadhwa - Dean of the All India Institute of Medical Sciences, New Delhi.

References

External links
 

Education in Jabalpur
Medical colleges in Madhya Pradesh
Memorials to Subhas Chandra Bose